Yoshihiro Nakano (born 2 June 1958) is a Japanese equestrian. He competed at the 1984 Summer Olympics, the 1988 Summer Olympics and the 1996 Summer Olympics.

References

External links
 

1958 births
Living people
Japanese male equestrians
Olympic equestrians of Japan
Equestrians at the 1984 Summer Olympics
Equestrians at the 1988 Summer Olympics
Equestrians at the 1996 Summer Olympics
Place of birth missing (living people)
Asian Games medalists in equestrian
Equestrians at the 1986 Asian Games
Equestrians at the 1994 Asian Games
Asian Games gold medalists for Japan
Medalists at the 1986 Asian Games
Medalists at the 1994 Asian Games